María Irigoyen Pérez (born 1 October 1952, in Soria) is a Spanish Socialist Workers' Party (PSOE) politician who served as Member of the European Parliament (MEP) from 2009 to 2014.

References

External links
 Official website 

1952 births
Living people
21st-century women MEPs for Spain
Spanish Socialist Workers' Party MEPs
People from Soria
MEPs for Spain 2009–2014